A Way of Life is the third studio album by Suicide, released in 1988. It was first distributed by Chapter 22 Records, then received wider global distribution through Wax Trax! Records a year later.  Visual artist Stefan Roloff produced a music video for the song "Dominic Christ" and Suicide went overseas to promote the album by performing the single "Surrender" in Paris which was aired on French television. In 2005, it was remastered containing a slight remix by Martin Rev and redistributed by Mute Record's Blast First sub-label with an additional disc of live material.

Track listing

Personnel
Adapted from the A Way of Life liner notes.
Suicide
 Martin Rev – keyboards, drum programming
 Alan Vega – vocals
Production and additional personnel
 Joe Barbaria – engineering
 Ric Ocasek – production

Release history

References

External links 
 

1988 albums
Suicide (band) albums
Albums produced by Ric Ocasek
Mute Records albums
Rough Trade Records albums
Wax Trax! Records albums